The IRB Development Award was previously presented by the IRB from 2002 to 2012.

Recipients

References

External links 

 World Rugby Awards

World Rugby Awards